Swisstek (Ceylon) PLC is a tile grout and tile mortar manufacturing company in Sri Lanka. The company was established in 1967 as Parquet (Ceylon) Ltd to manufacture parquetry. Parquet (Ceylon) signed an agreement with Switzerland-based Bauwerk AG for technology collaboration and started supplying for the domestic and foreign markets under the brand name "Swissparkett". The company was listed on the Colombo Stock Exchange in 1983. Parquet (Ceylon) switched its core business by switching to manufacturing tile grout and mortar in 2009. In 2011, the company was renamed Swisstek (Ceylon) and in 2013, became a part of the Vallibel One Group. Swisstek is one of the LMD 100 companies in Sri Lanka.

History
The company was founded in 1967 as Parquet (Ceylon) Ltd to manufacture parquetry. Singha Weerasekera, the then-chairman of Don Carolis and Sons, was the founding chairman of Parquet (Ceylon). Parquet (Ceylon) entered into a technology collaboration with Switzerland-based  and supplied the domestic market under the brand name "Swissparkett". The company expanded its business to foreign markets in 1972. The company was listed on the Colombo Stock Exchange in 1983. Parquet (Ceylon) became a part of Lanka Walltiles Group in 2003. In 2009, the company switched its core business of manufacturing parquetry to manufacturing tile grout and mortar. Even though the company ceased manufacturing parquetry, the sale of imported parquetry in the domestic market continued.

Parquet (Ceylon) acquired 62% of the stake in Ceykor Aluminium Industries for LKR100 million in a bid for diversification in 2010. Parquet (Ceylon) change name to Swisstek (Ceylon) in 2011. A Royal Ceramics-led consortium acquired a controlling stake in Lanka Ceramics PLC in 2013, thus Royal Ceramics' parent Vallibel One became the ultimate parent company of Swisstek. The company celebrated its 50th anniversary in 2017. Swisstek Aluminium moved to increase its production capacity of 450mt to 1,000mt per month in 2017. The demand for aluminium stood at 2,500mt per month then. Swisstek secured a US$4.5 million timber flooring contract from the Cinnamon Life Colombo project in 2019.  The contract is the largest timber flooring deal awarded in Sri Lanka. Swisstek entered into the contract to supply and install  of solid wood flooring for the project.

Operations
Swisstek is one of the LMD 100 companies in Sri Lanka. LMD 100 ranks the public companies in Sri Lanka by revenue annually, and in its 2020/21 edition Swisstek was ranked 95th. Swisstek (Ceylon) also produces skim coats and decorative pebbles, and its subsidiary, Swisstek Aluminium manufactures aluminium extrusions. Alumex, a related company of Swisstek is the market leader in aluminium production and controls 46% of the market share. Swisstek Aluminium Ltd has control of 30% of the market share.

Finances

Source: Annual Report, 2021/22 (pp. 123–124)

See also
 List of companies listed on the Colombo Stock Exchange

References

External links
 Official website

1967 establishments in Ceylon
Manufacturing companies established in 1967
Companies listed on the Colombo Stock Exchange
Manufacturing companies of Sri Lanka
Building materials companies